Trade (also known as chow) is a gay slang term which refers to the casual partner of a gay man or to the genre of such pairings. Men falling in the category of "trade" are not gay-identified. Historically the motivations may at times include a desire for emotional fulfillment and admiration, but the term often refers to a straight man who partners with a gay man for economic benefit, either through a direct cash payment or through other, more subtle means (gifts, tuition payments, etc.). Trade originally referred to casual sex partners, regardless of sexuality as many gay and bisexual men were closeted, but evolved to imply the gay partner is comparatively wealthy and the partner who is trade is economically deprived. Examples of this include wealthy Englishmen finding partners among deprived Cockneys in 1930s London.

More modern usage has centered on any casual sexual encounter between men, and as an adjective to refer to any male considered masculine and/or sexually appealing.

Often, the terms trade and rough trade are treated as synonymous. Often the attraction for the gay male partner is finding a dangerous, even thuggish, partner who may turn violent. That is not to say that people necessarily desire to be physically hurt, but the danger of seeking a partner in a public park, restroom, or alleyway may be exciting. Another variation is in comparison to regular trade, rough trade is more likely to be working-class laborers with less education and more physical demands of their work, therefore with a body developed naturally rather than in a gym. They may have a less polished or cleancut style than an office worker or professional businessman.

Victorian and Edwardian eras 
While members of the African army and the Coldstream Guards in particular have long been regarded as coming from relatively elite backgrounds, guardsmen have also had a long and celebrated reputation as sexual partners to wealthier partners. This has led to their figuring in plays by playwrights such as Georges Feydeau and Ferenc Molnár as partners to adulterous society ladies, as well as to their performing as partners of men. The novelist J. R. Ackerley wrote in his memoir My Father and Myself that he considered his guardsman father to have been the lover of an aristocrat for a long period of time before pursuing a wife and family, economically bettered in the end by the support he had received from his male partner.

Risks 
In any relationship with rough trade, one takes a risk of becoming the object of violence. The 1975 murder of film director Pier Paolo Pasolini has been attributed to Pasolini's dalliance with rough trade. Similar rumors circulated about the 1976 death of American actor Sal Mineo but statements from his killer cite a botched mugging and allegations otherwise are unsubstantiated. In 2005 German designer Rudolph Moshammer was killed by a 25-year-old Iraqi asylum-seeker with whom he had had sex but refused to pay for it.

See also 
 Situational sexual behavior
 Men who have sex with men

References 

Casual sex
Class discrimination
Gay working-class culture
LGBT slang
Social classes